(1846–1909) was a Japanese figure of the mid-19th century. The daughter of Tashiro Genbei of Edo, she became the concubine of the Aizu lord Matsudaira Katamori and gave birth to several of his children.

References

Tsunabuchi Kenjō, ed. Matsudaira Katamori no Subete. Tokyo: Shin Jinbutsu Oraisha, 1984.

1846 births
1909 deaths
People from Tokyo
Aizu-Matsudaira clan
Japanese concubines